Borivoje is a Serbian masculine given name of Slavic origin. It may refer to:

Borivoje Đorđević (born 1948), Serbian footballer
Borivoje Filipović (born 1982), Serbian footballer
Borivoje Grbić (born 1972), comic artist
Borivoje Kostić (1930–2011), footballer
Borivoje Mirković (1884–1969), general
Borivoje Todorović (born 1930), Serbian actor
Borivoje Ristić (born 1983), football goalkeeper
Borivoje Rumenić (born 1990), football goalkeeper
Borivoje Vukov (1929–2010), wrestler

See also
Borivojević, surname

Slavic masculine given names
Serbian masculine given names